Alceu Valença (born July 1, 1946) is a Brazilian singer, musician and songwriter.

Alceu Valenca was born in countryside Pernambuco, Northeast Brazil. He is considered the most successful artist in achieving an aesthetic balance between traditional northeastern Brazilian music and a broad range of electronic sounds and effects from pop music. One can find traces of maracatu, coco and "repentes de viola" (improvising fast-paced Brazilian folk music) in most of his songs. Alceu was able to utilize the electric guitar, the electric bass, and lately even a synthesizer was added to his broad scope of musical instruments.

Because of that, Alceu was able to recreate Northeastern traditional music, like baião, coco, toada, maracatu, frevo, caboclinhos, embolada and repentes: all sung with a sometimes rock sometimes alternative sounding music background. His music and his themes are intangible, universal and unlimited. However, his aesthetic basis is genuinely Brazilian Northeastern music.

Biography 

Alceu Valença was born in São Bento do Una in Northeast Brazil. When he was young, he used to listen songs by Dalva de Oliveira, Orlando Silva, Sílvio Caldas etc. When he was 5 years old, he participated in a music contest, singing a song by Capiba. Some years later, his mother got sick and his family moved to Recife to live in his aunt's house. In this period, Valença got interested in some musical instruments, such as acoustic guitar and viola. However, he only won his own guitar when he was 15.

In 1970, Valença earned a law degree at the Recife Law School. However, he only followed the career for a few of months. In fact, in the early 1970s, the reason he had no time for a law career was that he had already launched into a musical direction.

He started his musical career in 1968, with the group Underground Tamarineira Village, later known as Ave Sangria. He also played with Zé Ramalho and Elba Ramalho during this period. In 1972, he joined Geraldo Azevedo. Together, they participated of many festivals and, in that same years, recorded their first album: Alceu Valença & Geraldo Azevedo, also known as Quadrafônico.

Along his career, Valença recorded more than 20 albums and travelled around many countries, such as Portugal, France, Netherlands and United States. Actually, he is considered one of the greatest exponents of the music of Pernambuco.

Finally, with the 2013 release of Três Tons de Alceu Valença, a box with the oldies Cinco Sentidos (1981), Anjo Avesso (1983) and Mágico (1984) all of Alceu Valença's solo work is available on CD. In 2014, his album Amigo da Arte was nominated for the Latin Grammy Award for Best Brazilian Roots Album.

Discography

Albums 
1972: Alceu Valença & Geraldo Azevedo, Copacabana (aka Quadrafônico)
1974: A Noite do Espantalho, Continental (soundtrack, movie by Sérgio Ricardo, with Alceu Valença and Geraldo Azevedo)
1974: Molhado de suor, Som Livre
1976: Vivo!, Som Livre
1977: Espelho cristalino, Som Livre
1979: Saudade de Pernambuco, released in 1998 as a supplement of the newspaper Jornal da Tarde
1980: Coração bobo, Ariola
1981: Cinco sentidos, Ariola
1982: Cavalo de pau, Ariola
1983: Anjo avesso, Ariola
1984: Mágico, Barclay
1985: Estação da luz, RCA Victor
1985: Ao vivo, Barclay/Polygram
1986: Rubi, RCA Victor
1987: Leque moleque, BMG Ariola
1988: Oropa, França e Bahia, BMG Ariola

1990: Andar, andar, EMI Odeon
1992: 7 desejos, EMI Odeon
1994: Maracatus, batuques e ladeiras, BMG Ariola
1996: O grande encontro, BMG Brasil, with Elba Ramalho, Geraldo Azevedo and Zé Ramalho
1997: Sol e chuva, Som Livre
1998: Forró de todos os tempos, Oásis/Sony Music
1999: Todos os cantos, Abril Music
2001: Forró lunar, Columbia
2002: De janeiro a janeiro
2003: Ao vivo em todos os sentidos, Indie Records/Universal Music
2005: Na embolada do tempo, Indie Records/Universal Music
2006: Marco Zero ao vivo, Indie Records
2009: Ciranda mourisca, Biscoito Fino
2014: Amigo da Arte, Deck
2014: Valencianas, Deck, with Orquestra Ouro Preto

DVD 

2003: Ao vivo em todos os sentidos
2006: Marco Zero ao vivo
2014: Valencianas, with Orquestra Ouro Preto

References

External links 
 Official Alceu Valença website
 The Music of Alceu Valença independent site with all the lyrics and sound clips
 Alceu Valença at NordesteWeb
 
 MTV's Alceu Valença page
 Alceu Valença at Música de Pernambuco

1946 births
Brazilian agnostics
Brazilian composers
Federal University of Pernambuco alumni
Living people
People from Pernambuco
Latin Grammy Award winners